Dreams of Eschaton is a double-CD compilation album by American heavy metal band Manilla Road. It was released on June 2, 2016, in both CD and LP format on High Roller Records and features a re-issue of the Mark of the Beast album on the first disk along with both the 1979 demo Manilla Road Underground and the 1979 in-studio live After Midnight Live album on the second disk. The name of the compilation refers to the original title of what would become the Mark of the Beast album, released in 2002 but with most of its featured tracks recorded in 1981.

Track listing 
Disc 1 – Dreams of Eschaton
 "Venusian Sea" – 6:10
 "After Shock" – 5:09
 "Time Trap" – 6:54
 "Black Lotus" – 5:00
 "The Dream" – 2:43
 "The Teacher" – 4:46
 "Avatar" – 9:07
 "The Court of Avalon" – 7:18
 "Mark of the Beast" – 9:27
 "Triumvirate" – 8:15

Disc 2 – Manilla Road Underground (track 1–3) and After Midnight Live (track 4–8)
 "Far Side of the Sun" – 7:05
 "Manilla Road" – 11:42
 "Herman Hill" – 9:02
 "Chromaphobia" – 6:26
 "Life's So Hard" – 12:31
 "Pentacle of Truth" – 8:07
 "Dream of Peace" – 8:35
 "Herman Hill" – 7:55
 "Flakes of Time" – 8:04

Personnel 
 Mark Shelton – guitars, vocals
 Scott Park – bass
 Rick Fisher – drums

References 

Manilla Road albums
2016 albums